The 2005-06 season was Sydney FC's first season, formed to compete in the new Australian A-League competition.  The club finished second on the table in the regular season, and won the first A-League Grand Final, defeating Central Coast Mariners 1–0.  Sydney also represented Oceania at the FIFA Club World Championship 2005 where they were placed fifth.

Players

Squad

Transfers in

Short-term signings

Statistics

Competitions

Overall

2005 Oceania Club Championship Qualification

Matches

2005 Oceania Club Championship

Knockout stage

Group matches

Finals

2005 Pre-season Challenge Cup

Knockout stage

2005–06 A-League

League table

Knockout stage

Matches

Finals series

2005 FIFA World Club Championship

Appearances and goals
Players with no appearances not included in the list.

Team kit
All A-League club kits were supplied by Reebok through a sponsorship deal with the A-League, and all clubs initially had a white change strip, Sydney adopting a light blue trim to their away shirts.  The home shirt colour of sky blue adopted the NSW representative colour, contrasted with the navy blue and orange trim.

Shirt sponsorship was secured with health insurance provider Healthe.

End-of-season awards

Club Awards
 Player of the Year: Clint Bolton
 Top Scorer: Sasho Petrovski
 Defender of the Year: Alvin Ceccoli
 Midfielder of the Year: David Carney
 Forward of the Year: Dwight Yorke
 Members Player of the Year: David Carney
 Chairman's Award: Mark Rudan
 Finals Player of the Year: Steve Corica
 Goal of the Year: Alvin Ceccoli

A-League Awards
 Joe Marston Medal Winner: Dwight Yorke

Sydney FC seasons
Sydney Fc Season, 2005-06